Diplomystes nahuelbutaensis is a species of velvet catfish endemic to Chile where it occurs in the Bío-Bío River basin and in the Loncomilla River. It grows to a length of  TL and is a component of local commercial fisheries as well as being a gamefish.

References
 

 World Conservation Monitoring Centre 1996.  Diplomystes nahuelbutensis.   2006 IUCN Red List of Threatened Species.   Downloaded on 4 August 2007.

nahuelbutaensis
Catfish of South America
Freshwater fish of Chile
Endemic fauna of Chile
Fish described in 1987